The Baoshan Second Dam is a dam in Baoshan Township, Hsinchu County, Taiwan.

History
In 1986, the planning team of Water Resources Bureau of the Taiwan Provincial Government conducted preliminary study for a dam exploration to alleviate water scarcity problem in Hsinchu County in the future. In 1989, the initial planning to construct the dam began and the feasibility study started in 1993. In 1995, the Project Plan for the Second Baoshan Reservoir in Hsinchu County was proposed. The construction began in April 1997 and completed in June 2006. In 2020, the government announced that it would increase the height of the dam to increase the total water supply of Taiwan.

Technical specifications
The dam is an embankment type of dam. It spans over 58 meters high, 350 meters long with a volume of 2,052,000 m3. It produces a reservoir with a catchment area of 2.88 km2, full water level area of 1.93 km2 and a maximum depth of 151.73 meters. It has a total capacity of 31,900,000 m3 with effective capacity of 31,340,000 m3.

See also
 List of dams and reservoirs in Taiwan
 Baoshan Dam

References

2006 establishments in Taiwan
Buildings and structures in Hsinchu County
Dams completed in 2006
Dams in Taiwan